Curiosity – What's Inside the Cube? was an experimental video game by Peter Molyneux's studio 22cans. Originally called Curiosity, the game was later renamed to avoid confusion with the Mars rover. The social experiment ended on 26 May 2013 and was won by Bryan Henderson from Edinburgh, Scotland. The game was met with controversy after the reward ended up being less "life-changing" than claimed, and ultimately nearly nonexistent due to the commercial failure of Godus.

Background
Curiosity was a multiplayer social experiment. The game setting was a featureless and minimalist white room in the middle of which floated a giant cube made of billions of smaller cubes ("cubelets") and white, floating text across each layer, usually topic related (hashtag, notifications etc.), with small messages. Players tapped the cubelets to dig through the surface of each layer and reveal the next layer below. The goal was to reach the center and to discover what was inside the cube. Each layer, which had a distinct look or design, contained a clue as to what was in the centre of the cube. Each cubelet destroyed by a player awarded them coins. Coins could be spent on tools that temporarily enhanced the player's abilities, such as picks ranging from iron to steel to diamond that increased the number of cubelets destroyed with each tap, or firecrackers that could be laid on the cube in long strings to chain together explosions.

22cans added more gameplay mechanics as the players progressed through the cube. Version 2, released on 7 December, included three new features: Draw mode, Badgers and Golden Badgers, as well as a page graphing various statistics about the cube against time. In addition, Peter Molyneux suggested there may be more to the game than it would seem: "There is something we haven't told everybody about when you play the cube. When you play the cube you're also doing something else. You don't realise you're doing it. [...] You're not just doing things in the cube. You don't realise it but you're doing something in something else as well at the same time."

Peter Molyneux claimed that "what is inside the cube is life-changingly amazing by any definition". Critics stated that the game designer might be over-promising. When it was suggested to him that he should "tone down the enthusiasm", he responded: "I don’t want to believe less in something. I want to make something that is worthy of the emotion behind it."

Curiosity was one of the few games that could be successfully played by a simple robot.

According to the statistics pages available in-game from version 2, as of 8 Dec the game had over three million users. 22cans did not anticipate such widespread interest in the game, and were not prepared to handle the extreme load, causing connectivity issues to persist from launch day to nearly a week afterwards.

The floating text across the layers usually carried the hashtag for this 'game experiment', #Curiosity, or short, informal messages from the staff.

Release
The game was submitted to Apple on 28 September 2012. The game was intended to be released at 00:22 (12:22 AM) on 7 November 2012, but Apple released the game without the knowledge of 22cans early on 6 November.

The Android version was also released on 6 November. On launch day the application was unable to connect to the official server for the majority of users. Since its launch on Google Play, reviews were polarized with about a third of users rating 5 stars and two-thirds rating 1 star. Reviews consistently improved since version 2, which introduced 3 new gameplay features, was released on the Android store on 7 December.

Reception

At the time of the game's release, the iOS version received "mixed" reviews according to the review aggregation website Metacritic.

Layers
Each layer of the cube had a distinct look or design, usually alternating between photos and plain colours.
Developers said the cube originally contained around 69 billion cubelets. As of April 2013, there were approximately 50 layers remaining, consisting of 3.6 billion cubelets. The last layer was removed and the cube completed on 26 May 2013.

Completion
On 26 May 2013, 22cans and Peter Molyneux announced via Twitter that the last layer had been removed and the Cube had been opened, revealing the prize video to the winning player that had removed the final layer. The winner was identified as Edinburgh resident Bryan Henderson, who was given the option to either keep the contents of the cube to himself or share it with the public. Molyneux announced that Henderson opted to share the prize.

According to the video that Henderson saw and 22cans posted on YouTube the day that the experiment ended, the contents inside of the cube included the ability to be the sole, all-powerful, digital god within 22cans' upcoming release of Godus and to reap a small portion of all of the incoming revenue that is brought in by the game. However, as of January 2016, Henderson has received little to no contact with 22cans, and in light of recent departures from the studio along with lasting issues with multiplayer, Henderson likely won't be able to collect any portion of the game at all, and once he does, it will only be for six months, or even less if another player overthrows him, who then will take a portion of profits. Speaking to The Guardian, Molyneux explained that the person in charge of keeping in contact with Henderson left the company and no one was ever reassigned the position, an act which Molyneux called "inexcusable".

Upon learning about the controversy, indie publisher Devolver Digital and developer Roll7 decided to include Henderson as a non-playable character in their release Not a Hero.

References

External links
 Curiosity, Cubes & Numbers – Calculations about the size of the cube.
 Curiosity Cube Stats – Estimate of the time remaining until completion of the cube.
 Curiosity Cube Progress – Progress of cubelet destruction over time.
 

2012 video games
Android (operating system) games
IOS games
Multiplayer online games
Video games developed in the United Kingdom
Video game controversies